The Jameh Mosque of Abarkuh is related to the Timurid Empire and is located in the city center of Abarkuh, the Town square.

References

Mosques in Iran
Mosque buildings with domes
National works of Iran
Abarkuh
Abarkuh County
Buildings and structures in Yazd Province